Ścinawa  is a town and municipality on the Oder river in the Lower Silesian region of Poland. The Ścinawa train station is a key gateway for travel throughout the region, connecting major destinations such as Wrocław and Głogów. As of 2019, the town's population is 5,582. Between 1975 and 1998, Ścinawa was in Legnica Voivodeship. It is now part of Lubin County in Lower Silesian Voivodeship, and is the seat of the municipality called Gmina Ścinawa.

History

Ścinawa was first documented as a possession of the newly established Trzebnica Abbey in a deed issued by Pope Innocent III, which dates back to 1202, when it was part of fragmented Poland. Town privileges were first granted between 1248 and 1259 by Konrad I, Duke of Głogów. The town church of St John's was first constructed in 1209.

After the partition of the Duchy of Głogów by Konrad's sons in 1273, Ścinawa became the capital of a duchy in its own right under the rule of Konrad II the Hunchback. It was again united with the Duchy of Głogów under Duke Henry III in 1290. His son Jan, sole ruler at Ścinawa from 1317, paid homage to King John the Blind in 1329, after which his duchy became a fiefdom of Bohemia. Though the Polish king Casimir III the Great had renounced his claims to Silesia with the 1335 Treaty of Trentschin, he campaigned Silesia and in 1343 laid fire to Ścinawa until in 1348 the conflict was finally settled by the Treaty of Namslau. In 1358 Jan sold half of the Ścinawa to his cousin Duke Bolko II the Small of Świdnica, the only ruler of the Silesian Piasts who had refused to become a Bohemian vassal. Nevertheless, upon Bolko's death in 1368, his half was annexed by Emperor Charles IV. The town was a center of linen and cloth production.

As a part of the Bohemian kingdom, the remaining half of the Ścinawa lands fell to Duke Henry V of Iron at Żagań in 1365 and in 1397 was acquired by Duke Konrad II the Gray of Oleśnica. Under the rule of Duke Frederick II of Legnica, Ścinawa became part of the united duchies of Wołów and Brzeg in 1528. With the Lands of the Bohemian Crown, Ścinawa since 1526 belonged to the Habsburg monarchy. It was heavily devastated during the Thirty Years' War, when in October 1633 Albrecht von Wallenstein's troops nearby routed a Swedish corps under Jindřich Matyáš Thurn. 

Upon the death of the last Piast duke George William in 1675, his lands fell to the House of Habsburg as reverted fiefs. Many craftsmen emigrated afterwards, during the Counter-Reformation. With most of Silesia, Ścinawa was annexed by Prussia in 1742 and became part of the German Empire in 1871. During World War II the Germans established there forced labour camps for French and Soviet prisoners of war. Fiercely embattled between the Red Army and the Wehrmacht in the last days of World War II, the town to a great extent lay in ruins after 1945. The German population of Ścinawa was expelled and replaced with Polish settlers, according to the Potsdam Conference.

The town was affected by the 2010 Central European flood.

Sights

The town features a number of historic monuments including the Gothic church of the Exaltation of the Holy Cross, dating back to 1209, the town hall tower (19th century) and the partially preserved medieval city walls.

Sports
The town's soccer team, Odra Ścinawa, was established in 1946. Ścinawa also has a karate club named "GOJU-RYU" which has been very successful in regional, national and international competitions. In addition, each year Ścinawa holds swimming championships at the local pool. There is also a fishing club and a chess club in Ścinawa. Apart from organized sports, locals enjoy playing soccer, volleyball and basketball.

Ryszard Komornicki, a former Poland player and a former manager of FC Aarau, was born in the town.

Education
Ścinawa's educational institutions include an elementary school and a junior high school. The town is also home to a local day care.

Alzheimer's Treatment Center
In 2007, the Wrocław Medical Academy established an Alzheimer's Treatment Center in Ścinawa. The facility is the first of its kind in Poland and only the second in all of Europe. The building, which cost over 3 million US dollars to remodel, once served as a general hospital as well as an orphanage.

Twin towns – sister cities
See twin towns of Gmina Ścinawa.

References

External links
http://www.scinawa.pl/ Official Website Of Town and Municipality
http://www.scinawa.eu Online Service For Ścinawa And Surrounding Areas
 Jewish Community in Ścinawa on Virtual Shtetl

Cities and towns in Lower Silesian Voivodeship
Lubin County